Kim Dae-sung (Korean: 김대성; born May 10, 1972 South Korea) is a South Korean former footballer who played as a midfielder.

He started professional career at FC Seoul, then known as LG Cheetahs in 1995.

He is manager of Ansan Bookok Middle School FC since July 2012.

References

External links 
 

1973 births
Living people
Association football midfielders
FC Seoul players
K League 1 players
South Korean footballers
Daegu University alumni